Linta is a river in the region of Atsimo-Andrefana in southern Madagascar. It crosses the Route nationale 10 near Ejeda and flows into the Indian Ocean in the Bay of Langarano, east of  Androka.

Its main affluents are the Manakaralahy and Manakaravavy which are dry during the dry season from July to November. Its annual discharge is low, approx. 1-2 L/s/km.

References

Rivers of Atsimo-Andrefana
Rivers of Madagascar